

Peerage of England

|rowspan="2"|Duke of Cornwall (1337)||Prince Charles||1612||1625||1st Duke of York; Ascended the Throne, and all his honours merged in the Crown
|-
|Prince Charles James||1629||1629||Died, and the Dukedom lapsed to the Crown
|-
|Duke of Richmond (1623)||Ludovic Stuart, 1st Duke of Richmond||1623||1624||New creation; died, title extinct
|-
|rowspan="2"|Duke of Buckingham (1623)||George Villiers, 1st Duke of Buckingham||1623||1628||New creation for the 1st Marquess of Buckingham; died
|-
|George Villiers, 2nd Duke of Buckingham||1628||1687||
|-
|rowspan="2"|Marquess of Winchester (1551)||William Paulet, 4th Marquess of Winchester||1598||1628||Died
|-
|John Paulet, 5th Marquess of Winchester||1628||1675||
|-
|Earl of Arundel (1138)||Thomas Howard, 21st Earl of Arundel||1604||1646||
|-
|rowspan="2"|Earl of Oxford (1142)||Henry de Vere, 18th Earl of Oxford||1604||1625||Died
|-
|Robert de Vere, 19th Earl of Oxford||1625||1632||
|-
|Earl of Shrewsbury (1442)||George Talbot, 9th Earl of Shrewsbury||1617||1630||
|-
|rowspan="2"|Earl of Kent (1465)||Charles Grey, 7th Earl of Kent||1615||1623||Died
|-
|Henry Grey, 8th Earl of Kent||1623||1639||
|-
|Earl of Derby (1485)||William Stanley, 6th Earl of Derby||1594||1642||
|-
|rowspan="2"|Earl of Worcester (1514)||Edward Somerset, 4th Earl of Worcester||1589||1628||Died
|-
|Henry Somerset, 5th Earl of Worcester||1628||1646||
|-
|Earl of Cumberland (1525)||Francis Clifford, 4th Earl of Cumberland||1605||1641||
|-
|Earl of Rutland (1525)||Francis Manners, 6th Earl of Rutland||1612||1632||
|-
|Earl of Huntingdon (1529)||Henry Hastings, 5th Earl of Huntingdon||1604||1643||
|-
|rowspan="2"|Earl of Sussex (1529)||Robert Radclyffe, 5th Earl of Sussex||1593||1629||Died
|-
|Edward Radclyffe, 6th Earl of Sussex||1629||1643||
|-
|rowspan="2"|Earl of Bath (1536)||William Bourchier, 3rd Earl of Bath||1561||1623||Died
|-
|Edward Bourchier, 4th Earl of Bath||1623||1636||
|-
|rowspan="2"|Earl of Southampton (1547)||Henry Wriothesley, 3rd Earl of Southampton||1581||1624||Died
|-
|Thomas Wriothesley, 4th Earl of Southampton||1624||1667||
|-
|rowspan="2"|Earl of Bedford (1550)||Edward Russell, 3rd Earl of Bedford||1585||1627||Died
|-
|Francis Russell, 4th Earl of Bedford||1627||1641||
|-
|Earl of Pembroke (1551)||William Herbert, 3rd Earl of Pembroke||1601||1630||
|-
|Earl of Devon (1553)||William Courtenay, de jure 3rd Earl of Devon||1557||1630||
|-
|Earl of Northumberland (1557)||Henry Percy, 9th Earl of Northumberland||1585||1632||
|-
|rowspan="2"|Earl of Hertford (1559)||Edward Seymour, 1st Earl of Hertford||1559||1621||Died
|-
|William Seymour, 2nd Earl of Herford||1621||1660||
|-
|Earl of Essex (1572)||Robert Devereux, 3rd Earl of Essex||1604||1646||
|-
|Earl of Lincoln (1572)||Theophilus Clinton, 4th Earl of Lincoln||1619||1667||
|-
|rowspan="2"|Earl of Nottingham (1596)||Charles Howard, 1st Earl of Nottingham||1596||1624||Died
|-
|Charles Howard, 2nd Earl of Nottingham||1624||1642||
|-
|rowspan="2"|Earl of Suffolk (1603)||Thomas Howard, 1st Earl of Suffolk||1603||1626||Died
|-
|Theophilus Howard, 2nd Earl of Suffolk||1626||1640||
|-
|rowspan="2"|Earl of Dorset (1604)||Richard Sackville, 3rd Earl of Dorset||1609||1624||Died
|-
|Edward Sackville, 4th Earl of Dorset||1624||1652||
|-
|rowspan="2"|Earl of Exeter (1605)||Thomas Cecil, 1st Earl of Exeter||1605||1623||Died
|-
|William Cecil, 2nd Earl of Exeter||1623||1640||
|-
|Earl of Montgomery (1605)||Philip Herbert, 1st Earl of Montgomery||1605||1649||
|-
|Earl of Salisbury (1605)||William Cecil, 2nd Earl of Salisbury||1612||1668||
|-
|Earl of Richmond (1613)||Ludovic Stewart, 1st Earl of Richmond||1613||1624||Created Duke of Richmond, see above
|-
|Earl of Somerset (1613)||Robert Carr, 1st Earl of Somerset||1613||1645||
|-
|Earl of Bridgewater (1617)||John Egerton, 1st Earl of Bridgewater||1617||1649||
|-
|Countess of Buckingham (1618)||Mary Villiers, Countess of Buckingham||1618||1632||
|-
|Earl of Northampton (1618)||William Compton, 1st Earl of Northampton||1618||1630||
|-
|rowspan="2"|Earl of Leicester (1618)||Robert Sidney, 1st Earl of Leicester||1618||1626||Died
|-
|Robert Sidney, 2nd Earl of Leicester||1626||1677||
|-
|Earl of Warwick (1618)||Robert Rich, 2nd Earl of Warwick||1618||1658||
|-
|rowspan="3"|Earl of Devonshire (1618)||William Cavendish, 1st Earl of Devonshire||1618||1626||Died
|-
|William Cavendish, 2nd Earl of Devonshire||1626||1628||Died
|-
|William Cavendish, 3rd Earl of Devonshire||1628||1684||
|-
|rowspan="2"|Earl of March (1619)||Esmé Stewart, 1st Earl of March||1619||1624||Succeeded to the Dukedom of Lennox (Peerage of Scotland); died
|-
|James Stewart, 2nd Earl of March||1624||1655||Duke of Lennox in the Peerage of Scotland
|-
|rowspan="2"|Earl of Cambridge (1619)||James Hamilton, 1st Earl of Cambridge||1619||1625||Marquess of Hamilton in the Peerage of Scotland; died
|-
|James Hamilton, 2nd Earl of Cambridge||1625||1649||Marquess of Hamilton in the Peerage of Scotland
|-
|Earl of Warwick (1621)||John Ramsay, 1st Earl of Holderness||1621||1626||New creation; died, title extinct
|-
|Earl of Berkshire (1621)||Francis Norris, 1st Earl of Berkshire||1621||1622||New creation; died, title extinct
|-
|Earl of Carlisle (1622)||James Hay, 1st Earl of Carlisle||1622||1636||New creation
|-
|Earl of Denbigh (1622)||William Feilding, 1st Earl of Denbigh||1622||1643||New creation; Viscount Feilding in 1620
|-
|Earl of Bristol (1622)||John Digby, 1st Earl of Bristol||1622||1653||New creation
|-
|Earl of Middlesex (1622)||Lionel Cranfield, 1st Earl of Middlesex||1622||1645||New creation; Baron Cranfield in 1621
|-
|Earl of Anglesey (1623)||Christopher Villiers, 1st Earl of Anglesey||1623||1630||New creation
|-
|Earl of Holland (1624)||Henry Rich, 1st Earl of Holland||1624||1649||New creation; Baron Kensington in 1623
|-
|Earl of Clare (1624)||John Holles, 1st Earl of Clare||1624||1637||New creation
|-
|Earl of Bolingbroke (1624)||Oliver St John, 1st Earl of Bolingbroke||1624||1646||New creation
|-
|rowspan="2"|Earl of Westmorland (1624)||Francis Fane, 1st Earl of Westmorland||1624||1629||New creation
|-
|Mildmay Fane, 2nd Earl of Westmorland||1629||1666||
|-
|Earl of Cleveland (1626)||Thomas Wentworth, 1st Earl of Cleveland||1626||1667||New creation
|-
|Earl of Danby (1626)||Henry Danvers, 1st Earl of Danby||1626||1644||New creation
|-
|Earl of Manchester (1626)||Henry Montagu, 1st Earl of Manchester||1626||1642||New creation; Viscount Mandeville in 1620
|-
|rowspan="2"|Earl of Marlborough (1626)||James Ley, 1st Earl of Marlborough||1626||1629||New creation; Baron Ley in 1624; died
|-
|Henry Ley, 2nd Earl of Marlborough||1629||1638||
|-
|Earl of Mulgrave (1626)||Edmund Sheffield, 1st Earl of Mulgrave||1626||1646||New creation
|-
|Earl of Totness (1626)||George Carew, 1st Earl of Totnes||1626||1629||New creation; died, title extinct
|-
|Earl of Berkshire (1626)||Thomas Howard, 1st Earl of Berkshire||1626||1669||New creation; Viscount Andover in 1622
|-
|Earl of Monmouth (1626)||Robert Carey, 1st Earl of Monmouth||1626||1639||New creation; Baron Carey in 1622
|-
|Earl of Banbury (1626)||William Knollys, 1st Earl of Banbury||1626||1632||New creation
|-
|Earl of Norwich (1626)||Edward Denny, 1st Earl of Norwich||1626||1637||New creation
|-
|Earl Rivers (1626)||Thomas Darcy, 1st Earl Rivers||1626||1640||New creation; Viscount Colchester in 1621
|-
|Earl of Lindsey (1626)||Robert Bertie, 1st Earl of Lindsey||1626||1642||New creation
|-
|Earl of Sunderland (1627)||Emanuel Scrope, 1st Earl of Sunderland||1627||1630||New creation
|-
|Earl of Newcastle-upon-Tyne (1628)||William Cavendish, 1st Earl of Newcastle-upon-Tyne||1628||1676||New creation; Viscount Mansfield in 1620
|-
|Earl of Dover (1628)||Henry Carey, 1st Earl of Dover||1628||1666||New creation; Viscount Rochford in 1621
|-
|Earl of Peterborough (1628)||John Mordaunt, 1st Earl of Peterborough||1628||1643||New creation
|-
|Earl of Stamford (1628)||Henry Grey, 1st Earl of Stamford||1628||1673||New creation
|-
|Earl of Winchilsea (1628)||Elizabeth Finch, 1st Countess of Winchilsea||1628||1634||New creation; Viscountess Maidstone in 1623
|-
|Earl of Kingston-upon-Hull (1628)||Robert Pierrepont, 1st Earl of Kingston-upon-Hull||1628||1643||New creation; Viscount Newark in 1627
|-
|Earl of Carnarvon (1628)||Robert Dormer, 1st Earl of Carnarvon||1628||1643||New creation
|-
|Earl of Newport (1628)||Mountjoy Blount, 1st Earl of Newport||1628||1666||New creation; Baron Mountjoy in 1627
|-
|Earl of Chesterfield (1628)||Philip Stanhope, 1st Earl of Chesterfield||1628||1656||New creation
|-
|Earl of Thanet (1628)||Nicholas Tufton, 1st Earl of Thanet||1628||1632||New creation; Baron Tufton in 1626
|-
|Earl of St Albans (1628)||Richard Burke, 1st Earl of St Albans||1628||1635||New creation; also Earl of Clanricarde in the Peerage of Ireland; Viscount Tunbridge in 1624
|-
|rowspan="2"|Viscount Montagu (1554)||Anthony-Maria Browne, 2nd Viscount Montagu||1592||1629||Died
|-
|Francis Browne, 3rd Viscount Montagu||1629||1682||
|-
|Viscount Wallingford (1616)||William Knollys, 1st Viscount Wallingford||1616||1632||Created Earl of Banbury, see above
|-
|Viscount Doncaster (1618)||James Hay, 1st Viscount Doncaster||1618||1636||Created Earl of Carlisle, see above
|-
|Viscount Purbeck (1618)||John Villiers, 1st Viscount Purbeck||1619||1657||New creation
|-
|Viscount St Alban (1621)||Francis Bacon, 1st Viscount St Albans||1621||1626||New creation; died, title extinct
|-
|Viscount Saye and Sele (1624)||William Fiennes, 1st Viscount Saye and Sele||1624||1662||New creation
|-
|Viscount Wimbledon (1625)||Edward Cecil, 1st Viscount Wimbledon||1625||1638||New creation
|-
|Viscount Savage (1626)||Thomas Savage, 1st Viscount Savage||1626||1635||New creation
|-
|Viscount Conway (1627)||Edward Conway, 1st Viscount Conway||1627||1631||New creation; Baron Conway in 1625
|-
|rowspan="2"|Viscount Bayning (1628)||Paul Bayning, 1st Viscount Bayning||1628||1629||New creation; died
|-
|Paul Bayning, 2nd Viscount Bayning||1629||1638||
|-
|rowspan="2"|Viscount Campden (1628)||Baptist Hicks, 1st Viscount Campden||1628||1629||New creation; died
|-
|Edward Noel, 2nd Viscount Campden||1629||1643||
|-
|Viscount Dorchester (1628)||Dudley Carleton, 1st Viscount Dorchester||1628||1632||New creation; Baron Carleton in 1626
|-
|Viscount Wentworth (1628)||Thomas Wentworth, 1st Viscount Wentworth||1628||1641||New creation; Baron Wentworth in 1628
|-
|Baron le Despencer (1264)||Mary Fane, 3rd Baroness le Despenser||1604||1626||Died; Barony succeeded by the Earl of Westmorland, and held by his heirs until 1762, when it fell into abeyance
|-
|Baron de Clifford (1299)||Anne Clifford, 14th Baroness de Clifford||1605||1676||
|- 
|rowspan="2"|Baron Morley (1299)||William Parker, 13th Baron Morley||1618||1622||Died
|- 
|Henry Parker, 14th Baron Morley||1622||1655||
|- 
|Baron Zouche of Haryngworth (1308)||Edward la Zouche, 11th Baron Zouche||1569||1625||Died, Barony fell into abeyance, until terminated in 1815
|- 
|Baron Willoughby de Eresby (1313)||Robert Bertie, 14th Baron Willoughby de Eresby||1601||1640||Created Earl of Lindsey in 1626, Barony held by his heirs until 1779
|- 
|Baron Dacre (1321)||Richard Lennard, 13th Baron Dacre||1616||1630||
|- 
|Baron Scrope of Bolton (1371)||Emanuel Scrope, 11th Baron Scrope of Bolton||1609||1630||Created Earl of Sunderland in 1627, on his death, the Earldom became extinct, and Barony dormant
|- 
|Baron Berkeley (1421)||George Berkeley, 8th Baron Berkeley||1613||1658||
|- 
|Baron Dudley (1440)||Edward Sutton, 5th Baron Dudley||1586||1643||
|- 
|Baron Saye and Sele (1447)||William Fiennes, 8th Baron Saye and Sele||1613||1662||Created Viscount Saye and Sele in 1624, Barony held by his heirs, until 1781, when both titles became extinct
|- 
|Baron Stourton (1448)||Edward Stourton, 10th Baron Stourton||1588||1633||
|- 
|Baron Ogle (1461)||Catherine Ogle, 8th Baroness Ogle||1626||1629||Abeyance resolved; died, Barony succeeded by the Earl of Newcastle, and held by his heir until 1691, when it fell into abeyance
|- 
|rowspan="2"|Baron Willoughby de Broke (1491)||Fulke Greville, 5th Baron Willoughby de Broke||1606||1628||Died
|- 
|Margaret Greville, 6th Baroness Willoughby de Broke||1628||1631||
|- 
|rowspan="2"|Baron Monteagle (1514)||William Parker, 4th Baron Monteagle||1581||1622||Died
|-
|Henry Parker, 5th Baron Monteagle||1622||1655||
|-
|Baron Vaux of Harrowden (1523)||Edward Vaux, 4th Baron Vaux of Harrowden||1595||1661||
|-
|rowspan="3"|Baron Sandys of the Vine (1529)||William Sandys, 3rd Baron Sandys||1560||1623||Died
|-
|William Sandys, 4th Baron Sandys||1623||1629||Died
|-
|Elizabeth Sandys, 5th Baroness Sandys||1629||1645||
|-
|Baron Windsor (1529)||Thomas Windsor, 6th Baron Windsor||1605||1642||
|-
|Baron Wentworth (1529)||Thomas Wentworth, 4th Baron Wentworth||1593||1667||Created Earl of Cleveland, see above
|-
|Baron Mordaunt (1532)||John Mordaunt, 5th Baron Mordaunt||1601||1644||Created Earl of Peterborough; Barony held by his heirs until 1697
|-
|Baron Cromwell (1540)||Thomas Cromwell, 4th Baron Cromwell||1607||1653||Created Viscount Lecale in the Peerage of Ireland in 1624, Barony held by his heirs
|-
|Baron Eure (1544)||William Eure, 4th Baron Eure||1617||1646||
|-
|rowspan="2"|Baron Wharton (1545)||Philip Wharton, 3rd Baron Wharton||1572||1625||Died
|-
|Philip Wharton, 4th Baron Wharton||1625||1695||
|-
|Baron Sheffield (1547)||Edmund Sheffield, 3rd Baron Sheffield||1568||1646||Created Earl of Mulgrave, see above
|-
|Baron Willoughby of Parham (1547)||Francis Willoughby, 5th Baron Willoughby of Parham||1618||1666||
|-
|Baron Darcy of Aston (1548)||John Darcy, 3rd Baron Darcy of Aston||1602||1635||
|-
|Baron Darcy of Chiche (1551)||Thomas Darcy, 3rd Baron Darcy of Chiche||1581||1640||Created Earl Rivers in 1626, see above
|-
|rowspan="2"|Baron Paget (1552)||William Paget, 4th Baron Paget||1604||1629||Died
|-
|William Paget, 5th Baron Paget||1629||1678||
|-
|Baron North (1554)||Dudley North, 3rd Baron North||1600||1666||
|-
|rowspan="2"|Baron Chandos (1554)||Grey Brydges, 5th Baron Chandos||1602||1621||Died
|-
|George Brydges, 6th Baron Chandos||1621||1655||
|-
|Baron Hunsdon (1559)||Henry Carey, 4th Baron Hunsdon||1617||1666||Created Earl of Dover in 1628, see above
|-
|Baron St John of Bletso (1559)||Oliver St John, 4th Baron St John of Bletso||1618||1646||Created Earl of Bolingbroke in 1624, see above
|-
|rowspan="2"|Baron De La Warr (1570)||Henry West, 4th Baron De La Warr||1618||1628||Died
|-
|Charles West, 5th Baron De La Warr||1628||1687||
|-
|rowspan="2"|Baron Norreys (1572)||Francis Norris, 2nd Baron Norreys||1601||1622||Created Earl of Berkshire, and died on the following day
|-
|Elizabeth Wray, 3rd Baroness Norreys||1622||1645||
|-
|rowspan="2"|Baron (A)bergavenny (1604)||Edward Nevill, 1st Baron Bergavenny||1604||1622||Died
|-
|Henry Nevill, 2nd Baron Bergavenny||1622||1641||
|-
|Baron Danvers (1603)||Henry Danvers, 1st Baron Danvers||1603||1644||Created Earl of Danby, see above
|-
|rowspan="2"|Baron Gerard (1603)||Gilbert Gerard, 2nd Baron Gerard||1617||1622||
|-
|Dutton Gerard, 3rd Baron Gerard||1622||1640||
|-
|Baron Grey of Groby (1603)||Henry Grey, 2nd Baron Grey of Groby||1614||1673||Created Earl of Stamford, see above
|-
|Baron Petre (1603)||William Petre, 2nd Baron Petre||1613||1637||
|-
|Baron Russell of Thornhaugh (1603)||Francis Russell, 2nd Baron Russell of Thornhaugh||1613||1641||Succeeded as Earl of Bedford, see above
|-
|rowspan="2"|Baron Spencer (1603)||Robert Spencer, 1st Baron Spencer of Wormleighton||1603||1627||Died
|-
|William Spencer, 2nd Baron Spencer of Wormleighton||1627||1636||
|-
|rowspan="2"|Baron Wotton (1603)||Edward Wotton, 1st Baron Wotton||1603||1628||Died
|-
|Thomas Wotton, 2nd Baron Wotton||1628||1630||
|-
|Baron Denny (1604)||Edward Denny, 1st Baron Denny||1604||1630||Created Earl of Norwich, see above
|-
|Baron Arundell of Wardour (1605)||Thomas Arundell, 1st Baron Arundell of Wardour||1605||1639||
|-
|Baron Carew (1605)||George Carew, 1st Baron Carew||1605||1629||Created Earl of Totness, see above
|-
|rowspan="2"|Baron Stanhope of Harrington (1605)||John Stanhope, 1st Baron Stanhope||1605||1621||Died
|-
|Charles Stanhope, 2nd Baron Stanhope||1621||1675||
|-
|Baron Knyvett (1607)||Thomas Knyvet, 1st Baron Knyvet||1607||1622||Died, title extinct
|-
|Baron Clifton (1608)||Katherine Clifton, 2nd Baroness Clifton||1618||1637||
|-
|Baron Dormer (1615)||Robert Dormer, 2nd Baron Dormer||1616||1643||Created Earl of Carnarvon, see above
|-
|rowspan="3"|Baron Teynham (1616)||Christopher Roper, 2nd Baron Teynham||1618||1622||Died
|-
|John Roper, 3rd Baron Teynham||1622||1628||Died
|-
|John Roper, 3rd Baron Teynham||1628||1673||
|-
|Baron Houghton (1616)||John Holles, 1st Baron Houghton||1616||1637||Created Earl of Clare, see above
|-
|Baron Stanhope of Shelford (1616)||Philip Stanhope, 1st Baron Stanhope of Shelford||1616||1656||Created Earl of Chesterfield, see above
|-
|Baron Noel (1617)||Edward Noel, 1st Baron Noel||1617||1643||Succeeded as Viscount Campden, see above
|-
|Baron Verulam (1618)||Francis Bacon, 1st Baron Verulam||1618||1626||Created Viscount St Alban, see above
|-
|Baron Digby (1618)||John Digby, 1st Baron Digby||1618||1653||Created Earl of Bristol, see above
|-
|rowspan="2"|Baron Brooke (1621)||Fulke Greville, 1st Baron Brooke||1621||1628||New creation, died
|-
|Robert Greville, 2nd Baron Brooke||1628||1643||
|-
|Baron Montagu of Boughton (1621)||Edward Montagu, 1st Baron Montagu of Boughton||1621||1644||New creation
|-
|Baron Grey of Warke (1624)||William Grey, 1st Baron Grey of Werke||1624||1674||New creation
|-
|Baron Deincourt (1624)||Francis Leke, 1st Baron Deincourt||1624||1655||New creation
|-
|Baron Robartes (1625)||Richard Robartes, 1st Baron Robartes||1625||1634||New creation
|-
|Baron Craven (1627)||Willian Craven, 1st Baron Craven||1627||1697||New creation
|-
|Baron Fauconberg (1627)||Thomas Belasyse, 1st Baron Fauconberg||1627||1653||New creation
|-
|Baron Lovelace (1627)||Richard Lovelace, 1st Baron Lovelace||1627||1634||New creation
|-
|Baron Poulett (1627)||John Poulett, 1st Baron Poulett||1627||1649||New creation
|-
|Baron Clifford (1628)||Henry Clifford, 1st Baron Clifford||1628||1643||New creation
|-
|Baron Brudenell (1628)||Thomas Brudenell, 1st Baron Brudenell||1628||1663||New creation
|-
|Baron Hervey (1628)||William Hervey, 1st Baron Hervey||1628||1642||New creation; also Baron Hervey in the Peerage of Ireland
|-
|Baron Strange (1628)||James Stanley, 1st Baron Strange||1628||1651||New creation
|-
|Baron Maynard (1628)||William Maynard, 1st Baron Maynard||1628||1640||New creation; also Baron Maynard in the Peerage of Ireland
|-
|Baron Coventry (1628)||Thomas Coventry, 1st Baron Coventry||1628||1640||New creation
|-
|Baron Weston (1628)||Richard Weston, 1st Baron Weston||1628||1635||New creation
|-
|Baron Goring (1628)||George Goring, 1st Baron Goring||1628||1644||New creation
|-
|Baron Mohun of Okehampton (1628)||John Mohun, 1st Baron Mohun of Okehampton||1628||1640||New creation
|-
|Baron Savile (1628)||John Savile, 1st Baron Savile of Pontefract||1628||1630||New creation
|-
|Baron Boteler (1628)||John Boteler, 1st Baron Boteler of Brantfield||1628||1637||New creation
|-
|Baron Dunsmore (1628)||Francis Leigh, 1st Baron Dunsmore||1628||1653||New creation
|-
|Baron Powis (1629)||William Herbert, 1st Baron Powis||1629||1655||New creation
|-
|Baron Herbert of Chirbury (1629)||Edward Herbert, 1st Baron Herbert of Cherbury||1629||1648||New creation
|-
|}

Peerage of Scotland

|rowspan=2|Duke of Rothesay (1398)||Charles Stuart, Duke of Rothesay||1612||1625||Acceded to the Throne of England and Scotland
|-
|Charles James Stuart, Duke of Rothesay||1629||1629||Died
|-
|rowspan=3|Duke of Lennox (1581)||Ludovic Stewart, 2nd Duke of Lennox||1583||1624||Died
|-
|Esmé Stewart, 3rd Duke of Lennox||1624||1624||Died
|-
|James Stewart, 4th Duke of Lennox||1624||1655||
|-
|Marquess of Huntly (1599)||George Gordon, 1st Marquess of Huntly||1599||1636||
|-
|rowspan=2|Marquess of Hamilton (1599)||James Hamilton, 2nd Marquess of Hamilton||1604||1625||Died
|-
|James Hamilton, 3rd Marquess of Hamilton||1625||1649||
|-
|Earl of Angus (1389)||William Douglas, 11th Earl of Angus||1611||1660||
|-
|Earl of Argyll (1457)||Archibald Campbell, 7th Earl of Argyll||1584||1638||
|-
|rowspan=3|Earl of Crawford (1398)||David Lindsay, 12th Earl of Crawford||1607||1620||Died
|-
|Henry Lindsay, 13th Earl of Crawford||1620||1622||Died
|-
|George Lindsay, 14th Earl of Crawford||1622||1633||
|-
|Earl of Erroll (1452)||Francis Hay, 9th Earl of Erroll||1585||1631||
|-
|rowspan=2|Earl Marischal (1458)||George Keith, 5th Earl Marischal||1581||1623||Died
|-
|William Keith, 6th Earl Marischal||1623||1635||
|-
|Earl of Sutherland (1235)||John Gordon, 14th Earl of Sutherland||1615||1679||
|-
|Earl of Mar (1114)||John Erskine, 19th/2nd Earl of Mar||1572||1634||
|-
|Earl of Rothes (1458)||John Leslie, 6th Earl of Rothes||1611||1641||
|-
|Earl of Morton (1458)||William Douglas, 7th Earl of Morton||1606||1648||
|-
|Earl of Menteith (1427)||William Graham, 7th Earl of Menteith||1598||1661||
|-
|Earl of Glencairn (1488)||James Cunningham, 7th Earl of Glencairn||1578||1630||
|-
|Earl of Eglinton (1507)||Alexander Montgomerie, 6th Earl of Eglinton||1612||1661||
|-
|rowspan=2|Earl of Montrose (1503)||John Graham, 4th Earl of Montrose||1608||1626||Died
|-
|James Graham, 5th Earl of Montrose||1626||1650||
|-
|Earl of Cassilis (1509)||John Kennedy, 6th Earl of Cassilis||1615||1668||
|-
|Earl of Caithness (1455)||George Sinclair, 5th Earl of Caithness||1582||1643||
|-
|rowspan=2|Earl of Buchan (1469)||Mary Douglas, 6th Countess of Buchan||1601||1628||Died
|-
|James Erskine, 7th Earl of Buchan||1628||1664||
|-
|Earl of Moray (1562)||James Stuart, 3rd Earl of Moray||1591||1638||
|-
|Earl of Atholl (1596)||James Stewart, 2nd Earl of Atholl||1603||1625||Died, title extinct
|-
|rowspan=2|Earl of Linlithgow (1600)||Alexander Livingstone, 1st Earl of Linlithgow||1600||1621||Died
|-
|Alexander Livingston, 2nd Earl of Linlithgow||1621||1650||
|-
|Earl of Winton (1600)||George Seton, 3rd Earl of Winton||1607||1650||
|-
|Earl of Home (1605)||James Home, 2nd Earl of Home||1619||1633||
|-
|Earl of Perth (1605)||John Drummond, 2nd Earl of Perth||1611||1662||
|-
|rowspan=2|Earl of Dunfermline (1605)||Alexander Seton, 1st Earl of Dunfermline||1605||1622||Died
|-
|Charles Seton, 2nd Earl of Dunfermline||1622||1672||
|-
|Earl of Wigtown (1606)||John Fleming, 2nd Earl of Wigtown||1619||1650||
|-
|Earl of Abercorn (1606)||James Hamilton, 2nd Earl of Abercorn||1618||1670||
|-
|Earl of Kinghorne (1606)||John Lyon, 2nd Earl of Kinghorne||1615||1646||
|-
|Earl of Lothian (1606)||Robert Kerr, 2nd Earl of Lothian||1609||1624||Died, title extinct
|-
|Earl of Tullibardine (1606)||William Murray, 2nd Earl of Tullibardine||1609||1626||Resigned his titles in favour of younger brother, see below
|-
|Earl of Roxburghe (1616)||Robert Ker, 1st Earl of Roxburghe||1616||1650||
|-
|Earl of Kellie (1619)||Thomas Erskine, 1st Earl of Kellie||1619||1639||
|-
|Earl of Buccleuch (1619)||Walter Scott, 1st Earl of Buccleuch||1619||1633||
|-
|Earl of Haddington (1619)||Thomas Hamilton, 1st Earl of Haddington||1619||1637||
|-
|Earl of Nithsdale (1620)||Robert Maxwell, 1st Earl of Nithsdale||1620||1646||New creation
|-
|Earl of Galloway (1623)||Alexander Stewart, 1st Earl of Galloway||1623||1649||New creation
|-
|Earl of Seaforth (1623)||Colin Mackenzie, 1st Earl of Seaforth||1623||1633||New creation
|-
|Earl of Lauderdale (1624)||John Maitland, 1st Earl of Lauderdale||1624||1645||New creation
|-
|Earl of Annandale (1625)||John Murray, 1st Earl of Annandale||1625||1640||New creation; also Viscount of Annand since 1622
|-
|Earl of Tullibardine (1628)||Patrick Murray, 1st Earl of Tullibardine||1628||1644||New creation
|-
|Earl of Carrick (1628)||John Stewart, 1st Earl of Carrick||1628||1646||New creation
|-
|Earl of Atholl (1629)||John Murray, 1st Earl of Atholl||1629||1642||New creation
|-
|Viscount of Haddington (1606)||John Ramsay, 1st Viscount of Haddington||1606||1626||Created Earl of Holderness, see above
|-
|Viscount of Lauderdale (1616)||John Maitland, 1st Viscount of Lauderdale||1616||1645||Created Earl of Lauderdale, see above
|-
|Viscount of Falkland (1620)||Henry Cary, 1st Viscount of Falkland||1620||1633||New creation
|-
|Viscount of Dunbar (1620)||Henry Constable, 1st Viscount of Dunbar||1620||1645||New creation
|-
|Viscount of Stormont (1621)||David Murray, 1st Viscount of Stormont||1621||1631||New creation
|-
|Viscount of Ayr (1622)||William Crichton, 1st Viscount of Ayr||1622||1643||New creation
|-
|Viscount of Dupplin (1627)||George Hay, 1st Viscount of Dupplin||1627||1634||New creation
|-
|Viscount of Melgum (1627)||John Gordon, 1st Viscount of Melgum||1627||1630||New creation
|-
|Viscount of Drumlanrig (1628)||William Douglas, 1st Viscount of Drumlanrig||1628||1640||New creation
|-
|Lord Somerville (1430)||Hugh Somerville, 9th Lord Somerville||1618||1640||
|-
|Lord Forbes (1442)||Arthur Forbes, 9th Lord Forbes||1606||1641||
|-
|Lord Maxwell (1445)||Robert Maxwell, 10th Lord Maxwell||1613||1646||Created Earl of Nithsdale, see above
|-
|Lord Lindsay of the Byres (1445)||John Lindsay, 10th Lord Lindsay||1619||1678||
|-
|Lord Saltoun (1445)||Alexander Abernethy, 9th Lord Saltoun||1612||1668||
|-
|Lord Gray (1445)||Andrew Gray, 7th Lord Gray||1611||1663||
|-
|Lord Sinclair (1449)||John Sinclair, 9th Lord Sinclair||1615||1676||
|-
|rowspan=2|Lord Borthwick (1452)||John Borthwick, 8th Lord Borthwick||1599||1623||Died
|-
|John Borthwick, 9th Lord Borthwick||1623||1675||
|-
|rowspan=2|Lord Boyd (1454)||Robert Boyd, 7th Lord Boyd||1611||1628||Died
|-
|Robert Boyd, 8th Lord Boyd||1628||1640||
|-
|Lord Oliphant (1455)||Laurence Oliphant, 5th Lord Oliphant||1593||1631||
|-
|rowspan=2|Lord Cathcart (1460)||Alan Cathcart, 5th Lord Cathcart||1618||1628||Died
|-
|Alan Cathcart, 6th Lord Cathcart||1628||1709||
|-
|Lord Lovat (1464)||Simon Fraser, 6th Lord Lovat||1577||1633||
|-
|Lord Carlyle of Torthorwald (1473)||James Douglas, 6th Lord Carlyle||1605||1638||
|-
|Lord Crichton of Sanquhar (1488)||William Crichton, 9th Lord Crichton of Sanquhar||1612||1643||Created Viscount of Ayr, see above
|-
|Lord Hay of Yester (1488)||John Hay, 8th Lord Hay of Yester||1609||1653||
|-
|Lord Sempill (1489)||Hugh Sempill, 5th Lord Sempill||1611||1639||
|-
|Lord Herries of Terregles (1490)||John Maxwell, 6th Lord Herries of Terregles||1604||1631||
|-
|Lord Ogilvy of Airlie (1491)||James Ogilvy, 7th Lord Ogilvy of Airlie||1617||1665||
|-
|Lord Ross (1499)||James Ross, 6th Lord Ross||1595||1633||
|-
|Lord Elphinstone (1509)||Alexander, 4th Lord Elphinstone||1602||1638||
|-
|Lord Ochiltree (1543)||James Stewart, 4th Lord Ochiltree||1615||1658||
|-
|rowspan=2|Lord Torphichen (1564)||James Sandilands, 3rd Lord Torphichen||1617||1622||
|-
|John Sandilands, 4th Lord Torphichen||1622||1637||
|-
|Lord Paisley (1587)||Claud Hamilton, 1st Lord Paisley||1587||1621||Title succeeded by the Earl of Abercorn, see above
|-
|Lord Spynie (1590)||Alexander Lindsay, 2nd Lord Spynie||1607||1646||
|-
|Lord Lindores (1600)||Patrick Leslie, 2nd Lord Lindores||1608||1649||
|-
|Lord Campbell of Loudoun (1601)||John Campbell, 2nd Lord Campbell of Loudoun||1619||1662||
|-
|Lord Kinloss (1602)||Thomas Bruce, 3rd Lord Kinloss||1613||1663||
|-
|rowspan=2|Lord Colville of Culross (1604)||James Colville, 1st Lord Colville of Culross||1604||1629||Died
|-
|James Colville, 2nd Lord Colville of Culross||1629||1654||
|-
|Lord Scone (1605)||David Murray, 1st Lord Scone||1605||1631||Created Viscount Stormont, see above
|-
|Lord Balmerinoch (1606)||John Elphinstone, 2nd Lord Balmerino||1612||1649||
|-
|Lord Blantyre (1606)||William Stewart, 2nd Lord Blantyre||1617||1638||
|-
|Lord Coupar (1607)||James Elphinstone, 1st Lord Coupar||1607||1669||
|-
|Lord Holyroodhouse (1607)||John Bothwell, 2nd Lord Holyroodhouse||1609||1638||
|-
|Lord Garlies (1607)||Alexander Stewart, 1st Lord Garlies||1607||1649||Created Earl of Galloway, see above
|-
|Lord Balfour of Burleigh (1607)||Robert Balfour, 2nd Lord Balfour of Burleigh||1619||1663||
|-
|rowspan=2|Lord Cranstoun (1609)||William Cranstoun, 1st Lord Cranstoun||1609||1627||Died
|-
|John Cranstoun, 2nd Lord Cranstoun||1627||1648||
|-
|Lord Mackenzie of Kintail (1609)||Colin Mackenzie, 2nd Lord Mackenzie of Kintail||1611||1633||Created Earl of Seaforth, see above
|-
|Lord Pittenweem (1609)||Frederick Stewart, 1st Lord Pittenweem||1609||1625||Died, title extinct
|-
|rowspan=2|Lord Maderty (1609)||James Drummond, 1st Lord Madderty||1609||1623||Died
|-
|John Drummond, 2nd Lord Madderty||1623||1647||
|-
|rowspan=2|Lord Dingwall (1609)||Richard Preston, 1st Lord Dingwall||1609||1628||Died
|-
|Elizabeth Preston, 2nd Lady Dingwall||1628||1684||
|-
|Lord Saint Colme (1611)||James Stewart, 2nd Lord Saint Colme||1612||1620||Disinherited; lordship granted to the Earl of Moray
|-
|rowspan=2|Lord Ogilvy of Deskford (1616)||Walter Ogilvy, 1st Lord Ogilvy of Deskford||1616||1626||Died
|-
|James Ogilvy, 2nd Lord Ogilvy of Deskford||1626||1653||
|-
|Lord Carnegie (1616)||David Carnegie, 1st Lord Carnegie||1616||1658||
|-
|rowspan=2|Lord Melville of Monymaill (1616)||Robert Melville, 1st Lord Melville||1616||1621||Died
|-
|Robert Melville, 2nd Lord Melville||1621||1635||
|-
|rowspan=2|Lord Ramsay of Dalhousie (1618)||George Ramsay, 1st Lord Ramsay of Dalhousie||1618||Bef 1629||Died
|-
|William Ramsay, 2nd Lord Ramsay of Dalhousie||Bef 1629||1672||
|-
|Lord Jedburgh (1622)||Andrew Ker, 1st Lord Jedburgh||1622||1633||New creation
|-
|Lord Kintyre (1626)||James Campbell, 1st Lord Kintyre||1626||1645||New creation
|-
|Lord Aston of Forfar (1627)||Walter Aston, 1st Lord Aston of Forfar||1627||1639||New creation
|-
|Lord Barrett (1627)||Edward Barrett, 1st Lord Barrett of Newburgh||1627||1645||New creation
|-
|Lord Fairfax of Cameron (1627)||Thomas Fairfax, 1st Lord Fairfax of Cameron||1627||1640||New creation
|-
|Lord Napier (1627)||Archibald Napier, 1st Lord Napier||1627||1645||New creation
|-
|Lord Reay (1628)||Donald Mackay, 1st Lord Reay||1628||1649||New creation
|-
|Lord Cramond (1628)||Elizabeth Richardson, 1st Lady Cramond||1628||1651||New creation
|-
|Lord Wemyss of Elcho (1628)||John Wemyss, 1st Lord Wemyss of Elcho||1628||1649||New creation
|-
|}

Peerage of Ireland

|rowspan=2|Earl of Kildare (1316)||Gerald FitzGerald, 15th Earl of Kildare||1612||1620||Died
|-
|George FitzGerald, 16th Earl of Kildare||1620||1660||
|-
|Earl of Ormond (1328)||Walter Butler, 11th Earl of Ormond||1614||1633||
|-
|Earl of Waterford (1446)||George Talbot, 9th Earl of Waterford||1617||1630||
|-
|Earl of Clanricarde (1543)||Richard Burke, 4th Earl of Clanricarde||1601||1635||
|-
|rowspan=2|Earl of Thomond (1543)||Donogh O'Brien, 4th Earl of Thomond||1581||1624||Died
|-
|Henry O'Brien, 5th Earl of Thomond||1624||1639||
|-
|Earl of Castlehaven (1616)||Mervyn Tuchet, 2nd Earl of Castlehaven||1617||1630||
|-
|Earl of Desmond (1619)||Richard Preston, 1st Earl of Desmond||1619||1628||Died; title extinct
|-
|Earl of Cork (1620)||Richard Boyle, 1st Earl of Cork||1620||1643||New creation
|-
|Earl of Antrim (1620)||Randal MacDonnell, 1st Earl of Antrim||1620||1636||New creation
|-
|Earl of Westmeath (1621)||Richard Nugent, 1st Earl of Westmeath||1621||1642||New creation
|-
|Earl of Roscommon (1622)||James Dillon, 1st Earl of Roscommon||1622||1642||New creation
|-
|Earl of Londonderry (1622)||Thomas Ridgeway, 1st Earl of Londonderry||1622||1631||New creation
|-
|Earl of Meath (1627)||William Brabazon, 1st Earl of Meath||1627||1651||New creation
|-
|Earl of Barrymore (1628)||David Barry, 1st Earl of Barrymore||1628||1642||New creation
|-
|Earl of Carbery (1628)||John Vaughan, 1st Earl of Carbery||1628||1634||New creation; also created Baron Vaughan in 1621
|-
|Earl of Fingall (1628)||Luke Plunkett, 1st Earl of Fingall||1628||1637||New creation
|-
|Earl of Downe (1628)||William Pope, 1st Earl of Downe||1628||1640||New creation
|-
|Earl of Desmond (1628)||George Feilding, 1st Earl of Desmond||1628||1665||New creation; also created Viscount Callan in 1622
|-
|Viscount Gormanston (1478)||Jenico Preston, 5th Viscount Gormanston||1599||1630||
|-
|Viscount Buttevant (1541)||David Barry, 6th Viscount Buttevant||1617||1642||Created Earl of Barrymore, see above
|-
|Viscount Mountgarret (1550)||Richard Butler, 3rd Viscount Mountgarret||1602||1651||
|-
|Viscount Powerscourt (1618)||Richard Wingfield, 1st Viscount Powerscourt||1618||1634||
|-
|Viscount Dunluce (1618)||Randal MacDonnell, 1st Viscount Dunluce||1618||1636||Created Earl of Antrim, see above
|-
|Viscount Grandison (1621)||Oliver St John, 1st Viscount Grandison||1621||1630||New creation
|-
|Viscount Wilmot (1621)||Charles Wilmot, 1st Viscount Wilmot||1621||1644||New creation
|-
|Viscount Valentia (1621)||Henry Power, 1st Viscount Valentia||1621||1642||New creation
|-
|rowspan=2|Viscount Moore (1621)||Garret Moore, 1st Viscount Moore||1621||1627||New creation; died
|-
|Charles Moore, 2nd Viscount Moore||1627||1643||
|-
|rowspan=3|Viscount Dillon (1622)||Theobald Dillon, 1st Viscount Dillon||1622||1624||New creation; died
|-
|Lucas Dillon, 2nd Viscount Dillon||1624||1629||Died
|-
|Theobald Dillon, 3rd Viscount Dillon||1629||1630||
|-
|Viscount Loftus (1622)||Adam Loftus, 1st Viscount Loftus||1622||1643||New creation
|-
|rowspan=2|Viscount Beaumont of Swords (1622)||Thomas Beaumont, 1st Viscount Beaumont of Swords||1622||1625||New creation; died
|-
|Sapcote Beaumont, 2nd Viscount Beaumont of Swords||1625||1658||
|-
|Viscount Netterville (1622)||Nicholas Netterville, 1st Viscount Netterville||1622||1654||New creation
|-
|Viscount Montgomery (1622)||Hugh Montgomery, 1st Viscount Montgomery||1622||1636||New creation
|-
|Viscount Claneboye (1622)||James Hamilton, 1st Viscount Claneboye||1622||1644||New creation
|-
|rowspan=2|Viscount Magennis (1623)||Art Roe Magennis, 1st Viscount Magennis||1623||1629||New creation; died
|-
|Hugh Magennis, 2nd Viscount Magennis||1629||1639||
|-
|Viscount Lecale (1624)||Thomas Cromwell, 1st Viscount Lecale||1624||1653||New creation
|-
|Viscount Chichester (1625)||Edward Chichester, 1st Viscount Chichester||1625||1648||New creation
|-
|Viscount Kilmorey (1625)||Robert Needham, 1st Viscount Kilmorey||1625||1631||New creation
|-
|Viscount Somerset (1626)||Thomas Somerset, 1st Viscount Somerset||1626||1649||New creation
|-
|Viscount Carlingford (1627)||Barnham Swift, 1st Viscount Carlingford||1627||1634||New creation
|-
|Viscount Baltinglass (1627)||Thomas Roper, 1st Viscount Baltinglass||1627||1637||New creation
|-
|Viscount Castleton (1627)||Nicholas Saunderson, 1st Viscount Castleton||1627||1630||New creation
|-
|Viscount Killultagh (1627)||Edward Conway, 1st Viscount Killultagh||1627||1631||New creation
|-
|rowspan=2|Viscount Mayo (1627)||Tiobóid na Long Bourke, 1st Viscount Mayo||1627||1629||New creation; died
|-
|Miles Bourke, 2nd Viscount Mayo||1629||1649||
|-
|Viscount Sarsfield (1627)||Dominick Sarsfield, 1st Viscount Sarsfield||1627||1636||New creation
|-
|Viscount Boyle of Kinalmeaky (1628)||Lewis Boyle, 1st Viscount Boyle of Kinalmeaky||1628||1642||New creation
|-
|Viscount Chaworth (1628)||George Chaworth, 1st Viscount Chaworth||1628||1639||New creation
|-
|Viscount Savile (1628)||Thomas Savile, 1st Viscount Savile||1628||1659||New creation
|-
|Viscount Cholmondeley (1628)||Robert Cholmondeley, 1st Viscount Cholmondeley||1628||1659||New creation
|-
|Viscount Lumley (1628)||Richard Lumley, 1st Viscount Lumley||1628||1663||New creation
|-
|Viscount Taaffe (1628)||John Taaffe, 1st Viscount Taaffe||1628||1642||New creation
|-
|Viscount Molyneux (1628)||Richard Molyneux, 1st Viscount Molyneux||1628||1636||New creation
|-
|Viscount Monson (1628)||William Monson, 1st Viscount Monson||1628||1660||New creation
|-
|Viscount Muskerry (1628)||Charles MacCarthy, 1st Viscount Muskerry||1628||1640||New creation
|-
|Viscount Strangford (1628)||Thomas Smythe, 1st Viscount Strangford||1628||1635||New creation
|-
|Viscount Scudamore (1628)||John Scudamore, 1st Viscount Scudamore||1628||1671||New creation
|-
|Viscount Wenman (1628)||Richard Wenman, 1st Viscount Wenman||1628||1640||New creation
|-
|Viscount Ranelagh (1628)||Roger Jones, 1st Viscount Ranelagh||1628||1643||New creation
|-
|Viscount Bourke of Clanmories (1629)||John Bourke, 1st Viscount Bourke||1629||1635||New creation
|-
|Viscount FitzWilliam (1629)||Thomas FitzWilliam, 1st Viscount FitzWilliam||1629||1650||New creation
|-
|Viscount Fairfax of Emley (1629)||Thomas Fairfax, 1st Viscount Fairfax of Emley||1629||1636||New creation
|-
|Viscount Ikerrin (1629)||Pierce Butler, 1st Viscount Ikerrin||1629||1674||New creation
|-
|Baron Athenry (1172)||Richard III de Bermingham||1612||1645||
|-
|rowspan=2|Baron Kingsale (1223)||John de Courcy, 18th Baron Kingsale||1599||1628||Died
|-
|Gerald de Courcy, 19th Baron Kingsale||1628||1642||
|-
|Baron Kerry (1223)||Thomas Fitzmaurice, 18th Baron Kerry||1600||1630||
|-
|rowspan=3|Baron Slane (1370)||Christopher Fleming, 12th Baron Slane||1612||1625||Died
|-
|Thomas Fleming, 13th Baron Slane||1625||1629||Resigned
|-
|William Fleming, 14th Baron Slane||1629||1641||
|-
|Baron Howth (1425)||Nicholas St Lawrence, 11th Baron Howth||1619||1643||
|-
|Baron Killeen (1449)||Luke Plunkett, 10th Baron Killeen||1613||1637||Created Earl of Fingall, see above
|-
|Baron Trimlestown (1461)||Robert Barnewall, 7th Baron Trimlestown||1598||1639||
|-
|Baron Dunsany (1462)||Patrick Plunkett, 9th Baron of Dunsany||1603||1668||
|-
|Baron Delvin (1486)||Richard Nugent, 7th Baron Delvin||1602||1642||Created Earl of Westmeath, see above
|-
|Baron Power (1535)||John Power, 5th Baron Power||1607||1661||
|-
|rowspan=2|Baron Dunboyne (1541)||James Butler, 2nd/12th Baron Dunboyne||1566||1624||Died
|-
|Edmond Butler, 3rd/13th Baron Dunboyne||1624||1640||
|-
|rowspan=2|Baron Louth (1541)||Matthew Plunkett, 5th Baron Louth||1607||1629||Died
|-
|Oliver Plunkett, 6th Baron Louth||1629||1679||
|-
|rowspan=2|Baron Upper Ossory (1541)||Teige Fitzpatrick, 4th Baron Upper Ossory||1613||1627||Died
|-
|Barnaby Fitzpatrick, 5th Baron Upper Ossory||1627||1638||
|-
|rowspan=2|Baron Inchiquin (1543)||Dermod O'Brien, 5th Baron Inchiquin||1597||1624||Died
|-
|Murrough O'Brien, 6th Baron Inchiquin||1624||1674||
|-
|Baron Bourke of Castleconnell (1580)||Edmund Bourke, 5th Baron Bourke of Connell||1599||1635||
|-
|rowspan=2|Baron Cahir (1583)||Thomas Butler, 2nd Baron Cahir||1596||1627||
|-
|Thomas Butler, 3rd Baron Cahir||1627||1648||
|-
|Baron Chichester (1613)||Arthur Chichester, 1st Baron Chichester||1613||1625||Died, title extinct
|-
|rowspan=2|Baron Ardee (1616)||Edward Brabazon, 1st Baron Ardee||1616||1625||Died
|-
|William Brabazon, 2nd Baron Ardee||1625||1651||Created Earl of Meath, see above
|-
|Baron Boyle (1616)||Richard Boyle, 1st Baron Boyle||1616||1643||Created Earl of Cork, see above
|-
|Baron Moore (1616)||Garret Moore, 1st Baron Moore||1616||1627||Created Viscount Moore, see above
|-
|Baron Ridgeway (1616)||Thomas Ridgeway, 1st Baron Ridgeway||1616||1631||Created Earl of Londonderry, see above
|-
|Baron Hamilton (1617)||James Hamilton, 2nd Baron Hamilton||1617||1633||
|-
|Baron Bourke of Brittas (1618)||Theobald Bourke, 1st Baron Bourke of Brittas||1618||1654||
|-
|Baron Lambart (1618)||Charles Lambart, 2nd Baron Lambart||1618||1660||
|-
|Baron Mountjoy (1618)||Mountjoy Blount, 1st Baron Mountjoy||1618||1665||
|-
|Baron Balfour (1619)||James Balfour, 1st Baron Balfour of Glenawley||1619||1634||
|-
|rowspan=2|Baron Castle Stewart (1619)||Andrew Stuart, 1st Baron Castle Stuart||1619||1629||Died
|-
|Andrew Stewart, 2nd Baron Castle Stewart||1629||1639||
|-
|Baron Dillon (1619)||James Dillon, 1st Baron Dillon||1619||1642||Created Earl of Roscommon, see above
|-
|rowspan=2|Baron Folliot (1620)||Henry Folliott, 1st Baron Folliott||1620||1622||New creation; died
|-
|Thomas Folliott, 2nd Baron Folliott||1622||1697||
|-
|Baron Maynard (1620)||William Maynard, 1st Baron Maynard||1620||1640||New creation
|-
|Baron Gorges of Dundalk (1620)||Edward Gorges, 1st Baron Gorges of Dundalk||1620||1650||New creation
|-
|Baron Offaly (1620)||Lettice Digby, 1st Baroness Offaly||1620||1658||New creation
|-
|Baron Digby (1620)||Robert Digby, 1st Baron Digby||1620||1642||New creation
|-
|Baron Hervey (1620)||William Hervey, 1st Baron Hervey||1620||1642||New creation
|-
|Baron Fitzwilliam (1620)||William Fitzwilliam, 1st Baron Fitzwilliam||1620||1644||New creation
|-
|rowspan=2|Baron Caulfeild (1620)||Toby Caulfeild, 1st Baron Caulfeild||1620||1627||New creation; died
|-
|William Caulfeild, 2nd Baron Caulfeild||1627||1640||
|-
|Baron Aungier (1621)||Francis Aungier, 1st Baron Aungier of Longford||1621||1632||New creation
|-
|rowspan=2|Baron Blayney (1621)||Edward Blayney, 1st Baron Blayney||1621||1629||New creation; died
|-
|Henry Blayney, 2nd Baron Blayney||1629||1646||
|-
|Baron Dockwra (1621)||Henry Dockwra, 1st Baron Dockwra||1621||1631||New creation
|-
|Baron Esmonde (1622)||Laurence Esmonde, 1st Baron Esmonde||1622||1646||New creation
|-
|Baron Glean-O'Mallun (1622)||Dermot O'Mallun, 1st Baron Glean-O'Mallun||1622||1639||New creation
|-
|Baron Brereton (1624)||William Brereton, 1st Baron Brereton||1624||1631||New creation
|-
|Baron Herbert of Castle Island (1624)||Edward Herbert, 1st Baron Herbert of Castle Island||1624||1648||New creation
|-
|Baron Baltimore (1625)||George Calvert, 1st Baron Baltimore||1625||1632||New creation
|-
|Baron Coleraine (1625)||Hugh Hare, 1st Baron Coleraine||1625||1667||New creation
|-
|Baron Sherard (1627)||William Sherard, 1st Baron Sherard||1627||1640||New creation
|-
|Baron Boyle of Broghill (1628)||Roger Boyle, 1st Baron Boyle of Broghill||1628||1679||New creation
|-
|Baron Maguire (1628)||Bryan Maguire, 1st Baron Maguire||1628||1633||New creation
|-
|Baron Mountnorris (1629)||Francis Annesley, 1st Baron Mountnorris||1629||1660||New creation
|-
|}

References

 

Lists of peers by decade
1620s in England
1620s in Ireland
17th century in England
17th century in Scotland
17th century in Ireland
Lists of 17th-century English people
17th-century Scottish peers
17th-century Irish people
Peers
Peers